Gordon Joseph Gray (10 August 1910 – 19 July 1993) was a Scottish cardinal of the Catholic Church. He served as Archbishop of St. Andrews and Edinburgh from 1951 to 1985, and was elevated to the cardinalate in 1969. He was the first resident Scottish cardinal since the Restoration of the Scottish hierarchy in 1878 and the first since the Reformation.

Early life
Gordon Gray was born in Leith to Frank and Angela (née Oddy) Gray. He was the youngest of three children, he had a sister, Josephine, and a brother, George. After he attended Holy Cross Academy in Edinburgh, his uncle John Gray, a canon, suggested that he become a priest. He then studied at St. Joseph's Junior College in East Sussex from 1927 to July 1929, and entered St. John's Seminary in Wonersh in September 1929.

Priesthood
He was ordained to the priesthood by Archbishop Andrew McDonald, O.S.B. on 15 June 1935 and did pastoral work in the Archdiocese of St Andrews and Edinburgh until 1947. Attending St. Andrews University from 1936 to 1939, Gray became the first Catholic priest to graduate there since the Reformation. In 1939 he entered St Mary's University College, Twickenham in London, but his studies were interrupted by the outbreak of World War II. He was later made rector of St Mary's College, Blairs, near Aberdeen in 1947.

Episcopal career
On 20 June 1951, Gray was appointed Archbishop of St Andrews and Edinburgh by Pope Pius XII. He received his episcopal consecration on the following 21 September from Archbishop William Godfrey, with Bishops James Donald Scanlan and Edward Wilson Douglas serving as co-consecrators, in St. Mary's Cathedral.

In 1953, Gray founded St Andrew's College, Drygrange, as a new seminary for his archdiocese. From 1962 to 1965, he attended the Second Vatican Council. Beginning in 1964, he discussed interfaith marriages with the Church of Scotland.

Pope Paul VI created him Cardinal-Priest of S. Chiara a Vigna Clara in the consistory of 28 April 1969, and therefore the first resident cardinal in Scotland since David Beaton, over four centuries earlier. In 1977 Gray became the first cardinal to address the Church of Scotland's General Assembly. He once served as President of the Bishops' Conference of Scotland, and was one of the cardinal electors in the conclaves of August and October 1978, which selected Popes John Paul I and John Paul II respectively. In 1978, he voiced strong opinions regarding the birth of Louise Brown, the first child to be successfully born from in vitro fertilisation, saying: "I have grave misgivings about the possible implications and consequences for the future." During John Paul II's 1982 visit to the United Kingdom, he officially welcomed the Pope upon his arrival in Scotland.

Gray was considered to be theologically conservative but moderate in his temperament, giving him an "effective international role in the life of the Church." He was a member of the Congregation for Divine Worship and the Discipline of the Sacraments and Pontifical Council for Social Communications, and once chaired the International Commission on English in the Liturgy.

Later life
Gray received an Honorary Doctorate from Heriot-Watt University in 1981

Gray retired as archbishop of the St. Andrews and Edinburgh on 30 May 1985, after thirty-three years of service. He was succeeded by Keith O'Brien.

Gray died from a heart ailment in the Edinburgh Royal Infirmary at the age of 82. He is buried in the crypt of St. Mary's Cathedral.

References

External links
Cardinals of the Holy Roman Church
Catholic-Hierarchy

1910 births
1993 deaths
Roman Catholic archbishops of St Andrews and Edinburgh
Participants in the Second Vatican Council
Scottish cardinals
20th-century British cardinals
People from Leith
20th-century Roman Catholic archbishops in Scotland
Cardinals created by Pope Paul VI
Alumni of St Mary's University, Twickenham
People educated at St Augustine's High School, Edinburgh
Clergy from Edinburgh